The 1962 North Carolina Tar Heels football team represented the University of North Carolina at Chapel Hill during the 1962 NCAA University Division football season. The Tar Heels were led by fourth-year head coach Jim Hickey and played their home games at Kenan Memorial Stadium. The team competed as a member of the Atlantic Coast Conference, finishing tied for fourth.

Schedule

References

North Carolina
North Carolina Tar Heels football seasons
North Carolina Tar Heels football